Rodolfo Lombardi (1908–1985) was an Italian cinematographer.

Selected filmography
 The Prisoner of Santa Cruz (1941)
 After Casanova's Fashion (1942)
 Non ti pago! (1942)
 Music on the Run (1943)
 Special Correspondents (1943)
 Down with Misery (1945)
 The Black Eagle (1946)
 Desire (1946)
 Eleonora Duse (1947)
 The White Devil (1947)
 Eleven Men and a Ball (1948)
 Les Misérables (1948)
 The Mysterious Rider (1948)
 Cavalcade of Heroes (1950)
 The Lion of Amalfi (1950)
 Nobody's Children (1951)
 Seven Hours of Trouble (1951)
 Who Is Without Sin (1952)
 Falsehood (1952)
 Three Girls from Rome (1952)
 I Chose Love (1953)
 The World Condemns Them (1953)
 Vortice (1953)
 Cardinal Lambertini (1954)
 Theodora, Slave Empress (1954)
 The Mighty Crusaders (1957)

References

Bibliography
 Bondanella, Peter. The Films of Roberto Rossellini. Cambridge University Press, 1993.

External links

1908 births
1985 deaths
Italian cinematographers
People from Rome